Pugmark is the term used to refer to the footprint of most animals (especially megafauna). "Pug" means foot in Hindi (Sanskrit पद् "pad"; Greek πούς "poús"). Every individual animal species has a distinct pugmark and as such this is used for identification.

Wildlife conservationists are known to catalogue pugmarks in the areas where they operate. Pugmarks are also used for tracking rogue animals which may be a danger to mankind or even to themselves because of injuries etc. It is possible to make an accurate identification of species, sex, age and physical condition of an animal by those trained in the field.

Field data collection
In India, ‘Pugmark Tracking’ involves collection of pugmark tracings and plaster casts from the field and analysis of these separately for individual male, female, and cub of tiger and leopard, and their diagnostic track dimensions and spatial distribution.

In order to obtain good pug impressions, PIPs (pug impression pads) are laid along roads, animal tracks and footpaths. To cite an example, during the year 2002, in 71 Census Units of Similipal 8946 PIPs were laid over 1773 km of tracking routes, from which 764 pugmark tracings were collected along with 316 plaster casts.

Field data for each pugmark are collected in specially devised census forms. The plaster casts and tracings along with field information are together analysed with map of the area to remove repetitions and overlaps in pug-evidences collected for the same tiger. 

The final result indicates the (a) total numbers of male, female and cub of tiger and leopard, (b) their pugmark dimensions with stride where available, (c) the names of locations where the pugmarks of each tiger have been traced to show the gross movement areas (d) interrelationship among different tigers by linking each male to female and the latter to cubs tracked in the movement area, and finally (e) spatial distribution map.

Benefits as a data collection method
The above approach to pugmark tracking has been developed and got refined over three decades since it was first implemented in the year 1972 at the All India Level. Compared to any other method of data collection on a population of large carnivores, ‘Pugmark tracking’ is considered quick, involving about 10 days of ground preparation, 6 days of rigorous data collection, and about two to four weeks of data analysis. It is very cost-effective or economic, and all money spent in the process goes to local tribal people who act as assistants as they possess the skill to track animals in Indian jungles. It results in data which shows which forest beat possess how many, of what sex/age and which type of large carnivore. This brings a sense of responsibility among the guards, as none of the animals is ‘virtually’ generated through statistical interpretations. Like any study technique, Pugmark tracking also calls for sincerity for true reflection of structure and spatial distribution of the population of large carnivores.

See also
 Animal track
 Fingerprint
 Spoor
 Singh, L. A. K. (2000): Tracking Tigers: Guidelines for Estimating Wild Tiger Population Using the Pugmark Technique. (Revised Edition). WWF Tiger Conservation Programme, New Delhi.

External links

Pugmark-based Population Monitoring Protocol for the Tiger & other Large Felids
Strengthening The Monitoring System for Tigers
Comments on Monitoring Tiger Status and Habita
 WWF-India's National Nature Camping Programme - Corbett Report
WWF Bhutan story
How many tigers are there in Ranthambore National Park?
Colour photo of a pugmark
Scale of a pugmark
 Improved approach to tiger counting through pugmarks 

Anatomical terminology
Animal anatomy
Ethology